Nick Greenwood (born 21 October 1999) is a cricketer who plays for Jersey. In domestic cricket, he has played for Wellington in New Zealand.

Career
Greenwood was born in Jersey, and his family moved to New Zealand when he was two years old. In September 2019, he was named in Jersey's Twenty20 International (T20I) squads for the series against Qatar and the 2019 ICC T20 World Cup Qualifier tournament in the United Arab Emirates. He made his T20I debut for Jersey, against Qatar, on 9 October 2019.

In November 2019, he was named in Jersey's squad for the Cricket World Cup Challenge League B tournament in Oman. He made his List A debut, for Jersey against Uganda, on 2 December 2019. Four days later, in the match against Italy, Greenwood scored his first century in List A cricket.

In December 2020, he was named in Wellington's squad to play in the 2020–21 Ford Trophy in New Zealand. He made his first-class debut on 31 October 2021, for Wellington in the 2021–22 Plunket Shield season.

References

External links
 

1999 births
Living people
Jersey cricketers
Jersey Twenty20 International cricketers
Wellington cricketers
Place of birth missing (living people)